Gelmersee (or Lake Gelmer) is a reservoir in Bernese Oberland, Switzerland. The hydroelectric reservoir was completed in 1932, at about the same time as the Grimselsee reservoir, and both are  operated by Kraftwerke Oberhasli. The reservoir's volume is 13 million m³ and its surface area .

The reservoir may be reached by the Gelmerbahn from Handegg, Guttannen at 1,412 m. The funicular's track with a length of 1,028 m has a maximum inclination of 106%.

See also
List of lakes of Switzerland
List of mountain lakes of Switzerland

External links
Lake Gelmer

Reservoirs in Switzerland
Bernese Oberland
Oberhasli
Lakes of the canton of Bern
LGelmersee